Tiziana Terranova (Trapani-Sicily, 1967) is an Italian theorist and activist whose work focuses on the effects of information technology on society through concepts such as digital labor and commons. Terranova has published the monograph Network Culture. Politics for the Information Age, as well as a more extensive number of essays and speeches, and appeared as a keynote speaker in several conferences. She lectures on the digital media cultures and politics in the Department of Human and Social Sciences, at the University of Naples, 'L'Orientale'.

Theories
Perhaps the best known part of Terranova's work is her thesis, formulated in the early 2000s, that the free labor of users is the source of economic value in the digital economy. Free labor as a concept is rooted in Italian post-workerist and autonomist labor theories of value, such as Paolo Virno's re-reading of Marx's notion of the general intellect, Antonio Negri's theory of the social factory, and Maurizio Lazzarato's concept of immaterial labor. Free labor is free both in the sense that the laborers provide it voluntarily and in the sense that they are not remunerated by the beneficiaries of the labor (such as social media companies). As such, free labor is only the most extreme form of social labor receiving very little or no monetary compensation. For instance, Terranova describes the university as a 'diffuse factory': 'an open system opening onto the larger field of casualised and underpaid 'socialised labour power'.' Terranova has also argued that non-hierarchical, open access, free association, and non-monetary P2P networks may provide a post-capitalist social and economic infrastructure.

Bibliography (selected)

Books
 Network Culture. Politics for the Information Age – Pluto Press, London 2004.

Essays and speeches
 Free Labor: Producing Culture for the Digital Economy – Summer 2000.
 Failure to comply. Bioart, security and the market – Transversal, June 2007.
 Netwar 2.0: the convergence of streets and networks – Le Monde diplomatique, March 2012.
 Attention, Economy and the Brain – Culture Machine, Vol 13 (2012).
 Red Stack Attack – Effimera, February 2014.
 Keynote: Capture All Work – 29 January 2015.

See also
 Antonio Negri
 Paolo Virno
 Franco Berardi
 Post-Marxism

References

External links

 Tiziana Terranova's CV at the University of Naples “L’Orientale”

Living people
Italian Marxists
Autonomism
Anarcho-communists
Date of birth missing (living people)
Year of birth missing (living people)
Accelerationism
Philosophers of technology